Florin Mașala (14 August 1933, Bârlogu – 7 June 2013, Pitești) is a former Romanian football player. He was one of the most talented strikers of his generation.

Mașala was born and spent his early childhood in Bârlogu, Argeș County, a village in the Wallachian plains. When he was 11 he went to complete his medium studies in Piteşti at School of Commerce. He played for the first time for Sporting Club when he was still 17 and later for Dinamo Pitești. Mașala, together with former Sporting Club players Pericle Valeca, Marinică Maier and others, formed the nucleus of Dinamo Pitești from its beginnings and achieved the performance of promoting the team from the Regional Championship to the Second League.

Florin Mașala was married to Aurelia Mașala (née Panciu) and had two sons, Dragoș and Răzvan.

1933 births
2013 deaths
Romanian footballers
Association football forwards